The 2017 Florida Gators baseball team represented the University of Florida in the sport of baseball during the 2017 college baseball season.  The Gators competed in the Eastern Division of the Southeastern Conference (SEC).  They played their home games at Alfred A. McKethan Stadium on the university's Gainesville, Florida campus.  The team was coached by Kevin O'Sullivan in his tenth season as Florida head coach.  The Gators entered the season hoping to build upon their performance in the 2016 NCAA Tournament, where they finished seventh at the 2016 College World Series after losses to eventual national champion Coastal Carolina and Texas Tech. In the 2017 season, the Gators won their first baseball national championship by defeating LSU two games to none in the championship series.

Roster

By player

By position

Coaching staff

Schedule

! style="background:#FF4A00;color:white;"| Regular Season
|- valign="top" 

|- bgcolor="#ddffdd"
| February 17 ||  || No. 2 || McKethan Stadium Gainesville, FL || 5–4 || Byrne (1–0) || Raquet (0–1) || None || 5,402 || 1–0 || –
|- bgcolor="#ddffdd"
| February 18 || William & Mary || No. 2 || McKethan Stadium || 8–1 || Singer (1–0) || Sheehan (0–1) || None || 3,817 || 2–0 || –
|- bgcolor="#ddffdd"
| February 19 || William & Mary || No. 2 || McKethan Stadium || 11–6 || Kowar (1–0) || Powers (0–1) || None || 4,408 || 3–0 || –
|- bgcolor="#ffdddd"
| February 21 || at  || No. 2 || Sessions StadiumJacksonville, FL || 2–3 || Santana (1–0) || Baker (0–1) || None || 1,537 || 3–1 || –
|- bgcolor="#bbbbbb"
| February 22 || Jacksonville || No. 2 || McKethan Stadium || colspan=7|Postponed (rain) Makeup: May 3 
|- bgcolor="#ddffdd"
| February 24 || No. 17 Miami (FL)Rivalry || No. 2 || McKethan Stadium || 1–0 || Faedo (1–0) || Lepore (1–1) || Rubio (1) || 5,385 || 4–1 || –
|- bgcolor="#ddffdd"
| February 25 || No. 17 Miami (FL)Rivalry || No. 2 || McKethan Stadium || 2–0 || Singer (2–0) || Bargfeldt (1–1) || Rubio (2) || 6,160 || 5–1 || –
|- bgcolor="#ddffdd"
| February 26 || No. 17 Miami (FL)Rivalry || No. 2 || McKethan Stadium || 6–2 || Kowar (2–0) || Mediavilla (0–2) || None || 5,262 || 6–1 || –
|- bgcolor="#ddffdd"
| February 28 ||  || No. 2 || McKethan Stadium || 4–3 || Brown (1–0) || Williams (0–1) || Horvath (1) || 3,471 || 7–1 || –
|-

|-
|- bgcolor="#ffdddd"
| March 1 || at UCF || No. 2 || Orlando, FL || 2–11 || Sheridan (2–0) || Byrne (1–1) || None || 3,852 || 7–2 || –
|- bgcolor="#ddffdd"
| March 3 ||  || No. 2 || McKethan Stadium || 7–0 || Faedo (2–0) || Abrams (0–1) || None || 3,378 || 8–2 || –
|- bgcolor="#ddffdd"
| March 4 || Columbia || No. 2 || McKethan Stadium || 7–2 || Dyson (1–0) || Bahm (0–1) || None || 3,661 || 9–2 || –
|- bgcolor="#ddffdd"
| March 5 || Columbia || No. 2 || McKethan Stadium || 8–4 || Kowar (3–0) || Egly (0–1) || None || 3,675 || 10–2 || –
|- bgcolor="#ffdddd"
| March 7 || at  || No. 2 || JetBlue ParkFort Myers, FL || 3–7 || Leon (1–1) || Byrne (1–2) || None || 2,717 || 10–3 || –
|- bgcolor="#ffdddd"
| March 8 || Florida Gulf Coast || No. 2 || McKethan Stadium || 2–3 || Gray (1–0) ||  || Koerner (4) || 2,943 || 10–4 || –
|- bgcolor="#ddffdd"
| March 10 ||  || No. 2 || McKethan Stadium || 8–0 || Faedo (3–0) || McCarthy (0–3) || None || 3,413 || 11–4 || –
|- bgcolor="#ffdddd"
| March 11 (1) || Seton Hall || No. 2 || McKethan Stadium || 2–313 || Testani (1–0) || Milchin (0–1) || Pacillo (1) || 3,668 || 11–5 || –
|- bgcolor="#ddffdd"
||| Seton Hall || No. 2 || McKethan Stadium || 4–3 ||  || Politi (0–1) || Byrne (1) || 3,113 || 12–5 || –
|- bgcolor="#ddffdd"
| March 14 || No. 3 Florida StateRivalry || No. 5 || McKethan Stadium || 1–0 || Baker (1–1) || Karp (0–1) || Dyson (1) || 5,806 || 13–5 || –
|- bgcolor="#ffdddd"
| March 17 || at  || No. 5 || Plainsman ParkAuburn, AL || 3–14 || Thompson (4–0) || Faedo (3–1) || None || 2,563 || 13–6 || 0–1
|- bgcolor="#ffdddd"
| March 18 || at Auburn || No. 5 || Plainsman Park || 1–2 || Mize (3–0) || Singer (2–1) ||  || 2,901 || 13–7 || 0–2
|- bgcolor="#ffdddd"
| March 19 || at Auburn || No. 5 || Plainsman Park || 5–6 || Mitchell (4–0) || Rubio (0–1) || None || 3,302 || 13–8 || 0–3
|- bgcolor="#ddffdd"
| March 21 || at  || No. 12 || Melching FieldDeLand, FL || 9–811 || McMullen (2–0) || Onyshko (1–3) || None || 1,727 || 14–8 || –
|- bgcolor="#ddffdd"
| March 24 || No. 4 LSU ||  || McKethan Stadium || 1–0 || Faedo (4–1) || Lange (3–2) || Dyson (2) || 4,485 || 15–8 || 1–3
|- bgcolor="#ddffdd"
| March 25 || No. 4 LSU || No. 12 || McKethan Stadium || 8–1 || Singer (3–1) || Poché (5–1) || None || 4,751 || 16–8 || 2–3
|- bgcolor="#ffdddd"
| March 26 || No. 4 LSU || No. 12 || McKethan Stadium || 6–10 || Bush (1–0) || Baker (1–2) || Gilbert (3) || 3,811 || 16–9 || 2–4
|- bgcolor="#ddffdd"
| March 28 || Rivalry || No. 9 || Baseball GroundsJacksonville, FL || 4–1 || Milchin (1–1) || Karp (0–2) || Byrne (2) || 8,924 || 17–9 || –
|- bgcolor="#ddffdd"
| March 31 || at No. 23 Missouri || No. 9 || Taylor StadiumColumbia, MO || 4–3 || Faedo (5–1) || Houck (3–3) || Byrne (3) || 1,034 || 18–9 || 3–4
|-

|- bgcolor="#ddffdd"
| April 1 || at No. 23 Missouri || No. 9 || Taylor Stadium || 2–1 || Singer (4–1) || Plassmeyer (4–1) || None || 1,264 || 19–9 || 4–4
|- bgcolor="#ddffdd"
| April 2 || at No. 23 Missouri || No. 9 || Taylor Stadium || 2–1 || Kowar (4–0) ||  || Byrne (4) || 658 || 20–9 || 5–4
|- bgcolor="#bbbbbb"
| April 4 || Stetson || No. 7 || McKethan Stadium || colspan=7| Canceled (rain) 
|- bgcolor="#ffdddd"
| April 7 || Tennessee || No. 7 || McKethan Stadium || 6–710 ||  || Byrne (1–3) || Lipinski (2) || 3,894 || 20–10 || 5–5
|- bgcolor="#ffdddd"
| April 8 || Tennessee || No. 7 || McKethan Stadium || 2–310 || Lipinski (3–0) || Byrne (1–4) || None || 5,776 || 20–11 || 5–6
|- bgcolor="#ddffdd"
| April 9 || Tennessee || No. 7 || McKethan Stadium || 5–4 || Kowar (5–0) || Linginfelter (2–4) || Byrne (5) || 3,894 || 21–11 || 6–6
|- bgcolor="#ddffdd"
| April 11 || Rivalry ||  || Tallahassee, FL || 10–7 || Horvath (1–0) || Haney (1–2) || None || 5,944 || 22–11 || –
|- bgcolor="#ddffdd"
| April 13 || at Vanderbilt || No. 10 || Hawkins FieldNashville, TN || 10–6 || Milchin (2–1) || Hayes (0–1) || None || 3,148 || 23–11 || 7–6
|- bgcolor="#ffdddd"
| April 14 || at Vanderbilt || No. 10 || Hawkins Field || 0–2 || Wright (2–4) || Singer (4–2) || None || 3,626 || 23–12 || 7–7
|- bgcolor="#ddffdd"
| April 15 || at Vanderbilt || No. 10 || Hawkins Field || 20–8 || Kowar (6–0) || Fellows (3–2) || None || 3,626 || 24–12 || 8–7
|- bgcolor="#ddffdd"
| April 18 ||  || No. 10 || McKethan Stadium || 2–1 || Rubio (1–1) || Howze (2–3) || Byrne (6) || 2,777 || 25–12 || –
|- bgcolor="#ddffdd"
|  || No. 18 South Carolina || No. 10 || McKethan Stadium || 1–0 || Faedo (6–1) || Schmidt (4–2) || Byrne (7) || 3,254 || 26–12 || 9–7
|- bgcolor="#ffdddd"
| April 21 || No. 18 South Carolina || No. 10 || McKethan Stadium || 2–4 || Crowe (4–3) || Singer (4–3) ||  || 4,384 || 26–13 || 9–8
|- bgcolor="#ddffdd"
| April 22 || No. 18 South Carolina || No. 10 || McKethan Stadium || 7–5 || Milchin (3–1) || Bowers (3–1) || Byrne (8) || 3,604 || 27–13 || 10–8
|- bgcolor="#ddffdd"
| April 28 || at  || No. 8 || Foley FieldAthens, GA || 6–4 || Milchin (4–1) || Glover (0–2) || Byrne (9) || 2,126 || 28–13 || 11–8
|- bgcolor="#ddffdd"
| April 29 || at Georgia || No. 8 || Foley Field || 6–3 || Singer (5–3) || Adkins (5–5) || Byrne (10) || 3,082 || 29–13 || 12–8
|- bgcolor="#ddffdd"
| April 30 || at Georgia || No. 8 || Foley Field || 4–3 || Kowar (7–0) || Smith (2–5) || Byrne (11) || 1,945 || 30–13 || 13–8
|-

|- bgcolor="#ddffdd"
| May 2 ||  || No. 7 || McKethan Stadium || 8–7 || McMullen (3–0) || Wilson (0–4) || Milchin (1) || 3,238 || 31–13 || –
|- bgcolor="#ddffdd"
| May 3 || Jacksonville || No. 7 || McKethan Stadium || 6–2 || Horvath (2–0) || Potter (2–2) || None || 2,760 || 32–13 || –
|- bgcolor="#ddffdd"
| May 5 || Ole Miss || No. 7 || McKethan Stadium || 11–2 || Faedo (7–1) || McArthur (3–4) || None || 3,447 || 33–13 || 14–8
|- bgcolor="#ddffdd"
| May 6 || Ole Miss || No. 7 || McKethan Stadium || 7–4 || Horvath (3–0) || Woolfolk (3–2) || Byrne (12) || 4,227 || 34–13 || 15–8
|- bgcolor="#ddffdd"
| May 7 || Ole Miss || No. 7 || McKethan Stadium || 6–4 || Kowar (8–0) || Parkinson (5–3) || Byrne (13) || 3,747 || 35–13 || 16–8
|- bgcolor="#ffdddd"
| May 9 || No. 23  || No. 5 || McKethan Stadium ||  || Roberts (3–0) || Milchin (4–2) || None || 3,114 || 35–14 || –
|- bgcolor="#ddffdd"
| May 12 || at Alabama || No. 5 || Tuscaloosa, AL || 2–1 || Byrne (2–4) || Suchey (2–7) || None || 3,143 || 36–14 || 17–8
|- bgcolor="#ddffdd"
| May 13 || at Alabama || No. 5 || Sewell–Thomas Stadium || 13–6 || Singer (6–3) || Duarte (2–6) || None || 3,948 || 37–14 || 18–8
|- bgcolor="#ddffdd"
| May 14 || at Alabama || No. 5 || Sewell–Thomas Stadium || 10–5 || Kowar (9–0) || Eicholtz (1–3) || None || 4,288 || 38–14 || 19–8
|- bgcolor="#ffdddd"
| May 18 || No. 7 Kentucky || No. 5 || McKethan Stadium || 4–12 || Hjelle (9–2) || Faedo (7–2) || None || 3,693 || 38–15 || 19–9
|- bgcolor="#ddffdd"
| May 19 || No. 7 Kentucky || No. 5 || McKethan Stadium || 14–3 || Singer (7–3) || Logue (6–5) || None || 4,153 || 39–15 || 20–9
|- bgcolor="#ddffdd"
| May 20 || No. 7 Kentucky || No. 5 || McKethan Stadium || 6–4 || Kowar (10–0) || Lewis (6–3) || None || 3,938 || 40–15 || 21–9
|-

|-
! style="background:#FF4A00;color:white;"| Postseason
|-

|-
|- bgcolor="#ddffdd"
| May 24 || vs. No. 24 (8) Auburn ||  ||  Hoover, AL|| 5–4 || Dyson (2–0) || Coker (3–3) || Byrne (14) || 6,890 || 41–15 || 1–0
|- bgcolor="#ddffdd"
| May 26 ||  ||  ||  || 12–3 || Kowar (11–0) || Self (5–1) || None || 6,988 || 42–15 || 2–0
|- bgcolor="#ffdddd"
| May 27 || vs. No. 13 (4) Arkansas ||  ||  || 0–167 || Murphy (5–0) || Singer (7–4) || None || 10,793 || 42–16 || 2–1
|-

|-
|- bgcolor="#ddffdd"
| June 2 || (4)  ||  ||  || 10–6 || Kowar (12–0) || Keenan (6–1) || Byrne (15) || 2,390 || 43–16 || 1–0
|- bgcolor="#ddffdd"
| June 3 || (2) South Florida || No. 4 (1) || McKethan Stadium || 5–112 || Byrne (3–4) || Perez (6–3) || None || 2,954 || 44–16 || 2–0
|- bgcolor="#ffdddd"
| June 4 ||  || No. 4 (1) || McKethan Stadium || 2–6 || Densmore (2–1) || Singer (7–5) ||  || 2,077 || 44–17 || 2–1
|- bgcolor="#ddffdd"
| June 5 || (3) Bethune–Cookman || No. 4 (1) || McKethan Stadium || 6–1 ||  ||  || Byrne (16) || 2,166 || 45–17 || 3–1
|-

|-
|- bgcolor="#ddffdd"
| June 10 || No. 14 Wake Forest ||  ||  || 2–111 || Byrne (4–4) || Roberts (2–5) || None || 3,910 || 46–17 || 1–0
|- bgcolor="#ffdddd"
| June 11 || No. 14 Wake Forest ||  || McKethan Stadium ||  || Peluse (5–1) || Byrne (4–5) || None || 3,381 || 46–18 || 1–1
|- bgcolor="#ddffdd"
| June 12 || No. 14 Wake Forest ||  || McKethan Stadium || 3–0 || Dyson (3–0) || McCarren (5–4) || Faedo (1) || 3,381 || 47–18 || 2–1
|-
| colspan=11 | The game was suspended during the fifth inning due to rain and continued at 1:04 p.m. on June 12 prior to the start of the game scheduled for that day.
|-

|-
|- bgcolor="#ddffdd"
| June 18 || vs. No. 7 (6) TCU ||  || Omaha, NE || 3–0 || Faedo (8–2) || Janczak (9–1) || Byrne (17) || 23,543 || 48–18 || 1–0
|- bgcolor="#ddffdd"
| June 20 ||  ||  || TD Ameritrade Park || 5–1 || Singer (8–5) || McClure (8–4) || None || 22,222 || 49–18 || 2–0
|- bgcolor="#ffdddd"
| June 23 || vs. No. 7 (6) TCU ||  || TD Ameritrade Park || 2–9 || King (1–3) || Kowar (12–1) || None || 25,329 || 49–19 || 2–1
|- bgcolor="#ddffdd"
| June 24 || vs. No. 7 (6) TCU ||  || TD Ameritrade Park || 3–0 || Faedo (9–2) || Janczak (9–2) || Byrne (18) || 18,093 || 50–19 || 3–1
|-
! colspan=10|Championship Series
! bgcolor="#DDDDFF" width="5%" | Record
|- bgcolor="#ddffdd"
| June 26 || vs. No. 3 (4) LSU ||  || TD Ameritrade Park || 4–3 || Singer (9–5) || Reynolds (1–2) || Byrne (19) || 25,679 || 51–19 || 1–0
|- bgcolor="#ddffdd"
| June 27 || vs. No. 3 (4) LSU ||  || TD Ameritrade Park || 6–1 || Dyson (4–0) || Poché (12–4) || Kowar (1) || 26,607 || 52–19 || 2–0
|-

| Rankings from USA Today/ESPN Top 25 coaches' baseball poll. All times Eastern. Parentheses indicate tournament seedings. Retrieved from FloridaGators.com

Record vs. conference opponents

Rankings

References

Florida
Florida Gators baseball seasons
NCAA Division I Baseball Championship seasons
College World Series seasons
Florida
Southeastern Conference baseball champion seasons